St Chad's Church, Wishaw is a Grade II* listed parish church in the Church of England in Wishaw, Warwickshire.

History

The church dates from the 13th century. There was a major addition around 1700, and a substantial restoration in 1886 – 1887.

The pulpit was obtained from St Mark's Church Ladywood when it was demolished in 1947.

Monuments

Andrew Hacket, died 1709 
John Lisle Hacket, died 1673 
Mary Lisle, died 1676 
Thomas Lander, died 1809 
Howard Procter Ryland, died 1905
John Hacker, died 1718 
Lady Hacker, died 1716

References

Church of England church buildings in Warwickshire
Grade II* listed churches in Warwickshire